Kathleen Breck (born 1940), is an English actress. She was born in Mutare, Zimbabwe (then Southern Rhodesia).

She was chosen to star in West 11 over Julie Christie. The film was directed by Michael Winner who said "She quit acting, found a handsome and rich husband, and settled down to a delightful life with Allan Scott. He's both a screenwriter and the owner of a Scotch whisky company."

Select Credits
West 11 (1963)
Second City Reports  (1964)
Spaceflight IC-1: An Adventure in Space (1965)
The Frozen Dead (1966)
The Three Musketeers (1966)

References

External links
 Kathleen Breck at BFI
 Kathleen Breck at TCMDB
 

1940 births
Possibly living people
English actresses